Badun is an electronic, experimental jazz group from Denmark, formed in Århus in 2002 by Oliver Duckert, a long-time organizer and spokesperson for the electronic avant-garde movement in Denmark. 

Since the first Badun release in 2004, the group has had many different constellations and has collaborated with the likes of Aske Krammer, Icarus, Damo Suzuki, Snöleoparden, and Henrik Jespersen. 

The sound of Badun is in changing alignment with the passing of different ages and is in many ways, a timeless approach to jazz.

Discography

Albums
 Badun (Flyrec / Rump, 2007)
 Last Night Sleep (Merry X-mas Records / Mindwaves, 2009)
 s.o.t.s (Schematic / John Sparking, 2012)
 Shadow Case (Not Applicable, 2013)
 Graffiti Cabbage (Schematic / Leek, 2014)
 QS (Not Applicable, 2017)
 Future Twenty-Four (Schematic / Not Applicable, 2020)
 Mejlgade 53 / live with Damo Suzuki & Snöleoparden (Not Applicable, 2020)

EPs
 Tandoori Tentacle (Cactus Island Recordings / Merry X-mas Records, 2009)
 Flensburg / with Icarus (Not Applicable, 2011)

Compilations
 s.o.t.s Respace (Schematic / Leek, 2015)

Soundtracks
 Dreamers In The System (Leek Records, 2022)

External links
Official site   Bandcamp  cyber_jazz
Danish musical groups
Musical groups from Aarhus